San Leandro station is a Bay Area Rapid Transit (BART) station located off Davis Street (Route 61/122) in downtown San Leandro, California. The station has two elevated side platforms, with the faregates at ground level. It opened on September 11, 1972 – part of the first BART line.

Bus connections 

Like most BART stations, San Leandro station is served by AC Transit local buses, municipal circulators, and medical shuttles:
AC Transit: Tempo, 10, 75, 85, 89, 801
San Leandro LINKS: North Loop, South Loop
Kaiser Permanente: San Leandro Medical Center shuttle
A busway is located on the east side of the station. A five-month project to renovate the busway for Tempo bus rapid transit service began in August 2019.

See also 
List of Bay Area Rapid Transit stations

References

External links 

BART – San Leandro Station

Bay Area Rapid Transit stations in Alameda County, California
Stations on the Orange Line (BART)
Stations on the Green Line (BART)
Stations on the Blue Line (BART)
Railway stations in the United States opened in 1972
Buildings and structures in San Leandro, California
Bus stations in Alameda County, California